Ratu Tagive (born Australia) is an Australian rugby union player who plays for Glasgow Warriors at the  Wing position.

Rugby League
Tagive played for Canterbury-Bankstown Bulldogs and Wests Tigers in the Australian NRL.

Rugby Union

Amateur career

Converting to Union, Tagive played for Queanbeyan Whites in the John I Dent Cup whilst in the Brumbies extended training squad before moving on to Shute Shield side Eastern Suburbs for the 2016 season.

On his move to Scotland, Tagive turned out for Currie in the Scottish Premiership.

Tagive has been drafted to Stirling County in the Scottish Premiership for the 2018-19 season.

Professional career

He became part of the Brumbies squad, training with them from October 2014.

As a result of his performances in the premier club competitions in Canberra & Sydney, on 15 November 2016 it was announced that Tagive had joined Glasgow Warriors on a one-year deal. In an interview he stated that Glasgow Warriors became interested after former Warrior and former Eastern Suburbs teammate Steven Findlay posted a video of Tagive online. He stated that former Warrior Taqele Naiyaravoro also helped convince him to move to Glasgow.
On his home debut and only second appearance for the Glasgow Warriors, he scored his first try for the Scottish side in a bonus point 47-17 win over the Newport Gwent Dragons.

International career

Tagive received his first call up to the senior Scotland squad on 15 January 2020 for the 2020 Six Nations Championship.

Family

He is the younger brother of NRL player Peni Tagive. From a family of nine, Ratu had to work as a hotel porter in Canberra to help his mother overcome a gambling addiction.

External links 

Glasgow Warriors recruit winger Ratu Tagive
Powerful Australian winger Ratu Tagive signs deal with Glasgow Warriors

References 

1991 births
Living people
Australian expatriate rugby union players
Australian expatriate sportspeople in Scotland
Australian people of Fijian descent
Australian rugby league players
Australian rugby union players
ACT Brumbies players
Currie RFC players
Eastern Suburbs players
Expatriate rugby union players in Scotland
Glasgow Warriors players
Stirling County RFC players
Rugby union wings